Tabio is a Japanese manufacturer and retailer of socks, stockings and tights.

Tabio has 270 stores in Japan, US, France, UK, China and Taiwan.

See also

List of sock manufacturers

References

External links

Clothing companies of Japan
Socks
Hosiery brands